John Thynne may refer to:

John Thynne (1513-1580), was the steward of Edward Seymour, 1st Duke of Somerset, and a Member of Parliament.
John Thynne, 3rd Baron Carteret (1772–1849), English peer and politician
John Thynne, 4th Marquess of Bath (1831-1896), Lord Lieutenant of Wiltshire and Envoy Extraordinary to Portugal and Austria
John Thynne (died 1604), MP
Rev. Lord John Thynne, third son of Thomas Thynne, 2nd Marquess of Bath

See also
John Thynne Howe, 2nd Baron Chedworth (1714-1762)